Humf is a British animated children's television program featuring a furry creature named Humf. The show is centered on the title character and his exploration of the world. The show is produced by King Rollo Films and Rubber Duck. It is narrated by Caroline Quentin and was broadcast on Nick Jr. and Nick Jr. 2 from 2009-2017 in the UK and Ireland, ABC in Australia, RTÉ in Ireland, TVB in Hong Kong, Knowledge Network and BBC Kids in Canada, Okto in Singapore, Four in New Zealand and CBeebies in some international countries. The episodes are usually around 7 minutes long.

Main characters
Humf is a purple furry creature and the friend of Wallace and Loon. He resides in the middle flat of a multi-level home, with Wallace above him and Loon below him. Humf is known for his curiosity about the world around him and his desire to try new things, although he sometimes struggles to accomplish his goals.
Loon is a pink feathery creature who lives in the flat below Humf. She loves to go out to the park and the supermarket, most of the time with her friends Humf and Wallace, along with her mum. Her best friend is Bewla. She is the only one of the trio whose dad is never seen or mentioned.
Wallace is a green hairy creature who runs around and lives on the very top floor of the three-story building.
Humf's parents are blue and red furry creatures with green horns.
Uncle Hairy is Humf's uncle and likes to play with his friends. His girlfriend is Flora.
Loon's Mum is a pink feathery creature who lives with Loon in the flat below Humf.
Wallace's parents; his mum is a green hairy creature, and his dad is a blue hairy creature.
Flora is Uncle Hairy's girlfriend and Humf's auntie.
Bewla is Loon's best friend and Humf's other best friend. She is a blue fluffy creature with red hair and pointy ears. Like Loon, her dad is never seen or mentioned.
Bewla's Mum is a red, fluffy creature with brown hair.

Places
Most episodes will spend time in one or another of the main characters' flats. Often, characters will spend some time in a local park, which is within walking distance of the flats and involves crossing a road to get there. The park has play equipment, as well as a sandpit and green open spaces to run around in. Sometimes, characters will travel to the local supermarket, which involves walking along the pathway to get there. In the episode Humf Goes Swimming, Humf and Loons Mums take Humf and Loon to the Swimming Pool, which has a pool, a little slide, and changing rooms. In the episode Uncle Hairy's Cinema, Uncle Hairy and his girlfriend Flora take Humf, Loon and Wallace to the cinema. It involves travel by a bus to get there, as it was said in the episode that it is too far to walk there.

Typical plot
In general, plots are centered on Humf and his exploration of the world. One example is when Humf and his friends go to the park and see litter on the ground. They discuss it and then start to pick it up and put it in the bin with increasing vigour. Humf's mum interrupts when he goes to pick up a banana skin and explains that, to be safe, they should not attempt to pick up all litter, as some is yucky.

Other details
The series is aimed at pre-school children and was created by Andrew Brenner, directed by Neil Fitzgibbon, and produced by Alexi Wheeler.

Episode list
 Humf's Shadow
 Humf Hangs Up The Laundry
 Humf Is Hiding
 Humf And The Ants
 Humf's Friends
 Humf Is A Furry Thing
 Humf And The Scary Thing
 Humf's Special Stick
 Humf And The Hole In The Park
 Humf And The Balloons
 Humf's Special Cup
 Humf's Ball
 Humf's Favourite Book
 Humf Wakes Up Early
 Humf's Picnic
 Humf And The Tickle Monster
 Humf And The Moon
 Humf And All The Stars
 Uncle Hairy's Band
 Humf Goes Fast
 Humf's New Word
 Humf Gets Lost
 Humf Bakes Biscuits
 Humf In The Fog
 Slow Down Wallace
 Humf And The Big Boots
 Wallace's Bath
 Humf's Painting
 Loon's New Handbag
 Wallace Pretends Too Much
 Loon's Pushchair
 Humf Goes Very High
 Wallace's Quiet Game
 Humf's Red Mittens
 Humf Climbs A Mountain
 Uncle Hairy's Restaurant
 Uncle Hairy's Cinema
 Humf and the Fluffy Thing
 Mum And Dad's Party
 Loon's Ballet Lesson
 Humf's Surprise
 Humf And The Bed Bugs
 Humf And Wallace Fall Down
 Humf Changes His Mind
 Dad Goes on an Aeroplane
 Humf Puts It In The Bin
 Humf's Dog
 Humf And Loon's Special Treat
 Wallace's Favourite Toy
 Wallace's Tie
 Uncle Hairy's Keys
 Sitting Next To Uncle Hairy
 Mum's Flower
 Fireman Wallace
 Loon's Treasure
 Loon's Jack In The Box
 Humf's Splinter
 Wallace Won't Come Home
 Wallace's Bubbles
 Uncle Hairy's Takeaway
 Loon's Paddling Pool
 Loon's Best Friend
 Humf Goes Swimming
 Humf's New Name
 Humf's Busy Family
 Loon's Blackboard
 Crispy Cakehead Is Sad
 Loon's House
 Humf And The Wind
 Humf Is Very Big
 Humf's Mum's Phone
 Everybody Copies Uncle Hairy
 Humf's Dad Stays In Bed
 Flora Comes to Babysit
 Loon Goes Far Away
 Loon Gets Stuck
 Uncle Hairy's Magic
 Wallace Gets Very Cross

References

External links
 Humf on Nick Jr.
 Humf Site (archived via Wayback Machine)
 

British children's animated television shows
Nick Jr. original programming
2000s British animated television series
British flash animated television series
Television series by Entertainment One
2009 British television series debuts
2000s British children's television series
British preschool education television series
Animated preschool education television series
2000s preschool education television series
Animated television series about monsters